Herman Witzig (December 5, 1907 – November 28, 1944) was an American gymnast. He competed in seven events at the 1928 Summer Olympics.

References

1907 births
1944 deaths
American male artistic gymnasts
Olympic gymnasts of the United States
Gymnasts at the 1928 Summer Olympics
Sportspeople from New York City